Unbeatable (激戰) is a 2013 Hong Kong–Chinese sports drama film directed by Dante Lam. The film had its premiere at the Shanghai International Film Festival on June 18, 2013.

Plot
Ching Fai (Nick Cheung) is a former boxing champion who has struggled since his glory days, having gone to prison over involvement with the Triads due to financial problems and now working as a taxi driver. When Triad loan sharks torch his taxi and chase him down for money he owed, Fai decides to flee to Macau to avoid them.

In Macau, Fai accepts a job offer from an old friend to work as an assistant in a gym, while renting a room with a feisty young girl Peidan (Crystal Lee), who has been taking care of her psychologically unstable mother (Mei Ting) since her four-year-old son drowned and her husband left her for another woman. At the gym, Fai meets a young man, Lin Siqi (Eddie Peng) who wishes to learn Mixed Martial Arts in order to join an upcoming MMA tournament, the "Golden Rumble", which offers the winner millions of dollars - his motivation for doing so is to help out his father, a businessman who had recently lost a fortune due to a failed "flipping" deal, which has turned him into a depressed drunkard. Fai agrees.

Several months before the tournament, Fai has Lin follow a strict training regimen, and at the same time he develops a bond with Peidan and her mother. After the tournament begins, Lin struggles but is able to beat several opponents, making it into the semi-finals, impressing both Fai and Lin's father, but also gets the attention of the Triads. Later, while celebrating the Mid-Autumn Festival, loan sharks unexpectedly show up to attack Fai and Peidan's family. Fai fends them off, but Peidan is hurt in the process. As she is hospitalized, social services are also alerted to the fact that her mother is psychologically unfit to take care of a child. When she is told that Peidan's father is returning to take custody of Peidan, she violently assaults a social worker, immediately causing her to be placed into a mental hospital. At the same time, Lin faces his toughest opponent yet, and loses badly after his arm and neck are broken.

Believing that he has "done nothing" for twenty years, Fai decides to join the tournament himself and trains vigorously for it, and is selected to enter the finals. Peidan's father also comes to meet Fai, and although Fai feels indifferent towards him at first, the father tells him that Peidan has agreed to live with him, but only if Fai wins in the tournament. After a brutal fight watched by many, including Lin in the hospital, Fai ultimately emerges victorious (by taking advantage of his easily dislocated right shoulder), and Lin is so excited over the victory that he leaps out of his wheelchair, cured.

With his newly earned fortune, Fai pays off his loans and meets Peidan one last time, while also continuing to visit Peidan's mother. He later meets a now recovered Lin, and the two joke about the injuries that they have each endured in the ring.

Cast
 Nick Cheung as Ching Fai
 Eddie Peng as Lin Siqi
 Crystal Lee as Liang Peidan
 Mei Ting as Wang Mingjun
 Philip Keung as Yeung Hin-sun
 Li Feier as Coco (only appears in China Mainland version)
 Jack Kao as Lin Yuanxiang
 Andy On as Li Zitian
 Will Liu as Rock Kong
 Liu Chunwei as young Ching Fai
 Michelle Lo as Sandy Lo
 Stephen Au as Master Kwan, Ching Fai's master
 Noel Leung as psychiatrist
 Wang Baoqiang as Boss Chan

Production
An early candidate for the English-language title for the film was MMA. The film was written by Jack Ng, Dante Lam and Fung Chi-fung. Ng and Lam had previously worked together on The Viral Factor, The Stool Pigeon, and Fire of Conscience.

Release
The film had premiered at the Shanghai International Film Festival on June 18, 2013. It was released in China on August 16, 2013.

Reception

Critical response
Clarence Tsui of The Hollywood Reporter writes, "It’s this mix of tears and laughter amidst the blood, sweat and broken necks that makes Unbeatable an enjoyable vehicle."

Andrew Chan of the Film Critics Circle of Australia writes, "Unbeatable is one of those films that never stops to excite, entertain, inspire and finally understand. It is an accomplished effort from a director very much in his prime and also bringing a veteran actor to even greater heights."

Kevin Ma of LoveHKFilm states that "with a career-best performance by Nick Cheung, a script infused with great humor and MMA scenes that will please action fanboys, this sports drama is Dante Lam’s best film since The Beast Stalker and easily his most purely enjoyable to date. Unbeatable offers nothing new, but it’s solid genre entertainment." He informs audiences that "Unbeatable’s selling point is mixed martial arts, but it’s really a character-driven drama about three troubled souls in Macau," using the words "uplifting" and "inspiring" to describe the film.

Box office
By 1 September 2013, Unbeatable had earned over HK$32.5 million in the box office of Hong Kong. It was the highest-grossing film of the summer and also the highest grossing locally produced film of 2013. Lead actor Cheung Ka-Fai said he would appear in eight cinemas to thank the cinemagoers' support and drive the box office results further up. By the end of September 2013, the film had earned over HK$43 million.

Awards

Notes

External links
 

2013 films
Mixed martial arts films
2010s sports films
Martial arts tournament films
Sports fiction
2010s Cantonese-language films
Films directed by Dante Lam
Chinese sports films
Hong Kong boxing films
2010s Hong Kong films